Sphyracephala brevicornis is a species in the family Diopsidae ("stalk-eyed flies"), in the order Diptera ("flies"). A common name for Sphyracephala brevicornis is "short-horned ankle-headed fly".

References

External links
NCBI Taxonomy Browser, Sphyracephala brevicornis

Diopsidae
Insects described in 1817